Arrowhead Lake is a census-designated place (CDP) in Cumberland County, New Jersey, United States. It is in the northwestern part of the county, in the northern part of Stow Creek Township. A small artificial lake is in the northwestern part of the CDP, with a residential neighborhood on its southern shore. 

New Jersey Route 49 forms the eastern boundary of the CDP; the road heads southeast  to Bridgeton and northwest  to Salem.

Arrowhead Lake was first listed as a CDP prior to the 2020 census with a population of 126.

Demographics

References 

Census-designated places in Cumberland County, New Jersey
Census-designated places in New Jersey
Upper Deerfield Township, New Jersey